The 2005 Campeonato Paulista de Futebol Profissional da Primeira Divisão - Série A1 was the 104th season of São Paulo's top professional football league. The competition began on 19 January and ended on 17 April.
São Paulo were the champions for the 21st time in history.

Teams

League table

Top goalscorers

Source:

See also
 Copa Paulista de Futebol
 Campeonato Paulista Série A2
 Campeonato Paulista Série A3
 Campeonato Paulista Segunda Divisão

References

External links

Campeonato Paulista seasons
Paulista